This is a list of media in the Mobile, Alabama metropolitan area.

Radio

Television

Mobile is served locally by several television stations: WPMI 15 (NBC), WKRG 5 (CBS), WALA 10 (FOX), and WFNA 55 (CW). The regional area is also served by WEAR 3 (ABC) and WJTC 44, an independent station (both based in Pensacola, Florida), and by WFGX. Mobile is included in the Mobile-Pensacola-Fort Walton Beach designated market area, as defined by Nielsen Media Research, and is ranked 61st in the United States for the 2007-08 television season.

Print

Mobile's Press-Register is Alabama's oldest active newspaper, dating back to 1813. The paper focuses on Mobile and Baldwin counties and the city of Mobile, but also serves southwestern Alabama and southeastern Mississippi.  Mobile's alternative newspaper is the Lagniappe.  The Mobile area's local magazine is Mobile Bay Monthly.
Mod Mobilian is a website with a focus on cultured-living in Mobile. MobileALnews.com is a local news website.

See also
 Alabama media
 List of newspapers in Alabama
 List of radio stations in Alabama
 List of television stations in Alabama
 Media in cities in Alabama: Birmingham, Huntsville, Montgomery

References

Bibliography

External links
 
  (Directory ceased in 2017)

Images

Mobile, Alabama